In differential geometry, the tangent indicatrix of a closed space curve is a curve on the unit sphere intimately related to the curvature of the original curve. Let  be a closed curve with nowhere-vanishing tangent vector .

References
 Solomon, B. "Tantrices of Spherical Curves." American Mathematical Monthly 103, 30–39, 1996.

Differential geometry
Spherical geometry